Paul Alfred Gordon (1930 – June 25, 2009) was a Seventh-day Adventist. He was director of the Ellen G. White Estate from 1990 to 1995.

Background
Paul Gordon was born in 1930. A graduate of Auburn Academy in Washington and of what is now Walla Walla University in College Place, Washington, Gordon began his work for the Seventh-day Adventist Church with pastoral ministry in Oregon and Washington state, as well as service as a Bible teacher at both Upper Columbia Academy and Milo Adventist Academy.

He served in the White Estate for over 30 years, serving for 5 years as director of the organization which safeguards and promotes the writings and ministry of Ellen G. White, a pioneering founder of the movement. He traveled to more than 100 countries in his work with the White Estate, retiring in 1995.

In 1981, Gordon was a co-founder of the Adventist Heritage Ministry, and led out in the acquisition of the William Miller home in 1984. He was the primary compiler for four morning devotional books; and authored numerous articles for church periodicals including Adventist Review. His two-part 1980 Review article, “The Right to Vote – Shall I Exercise It?” were subjects which are still cited as important articles.

Gordon died in 2009 at the age of 79, and was survived by his wife Donna, their four children, and a number of grandchildren.

See also 

 Seventh-day Adventist Church
 Seventh-day Adventist theology
 Seventh-day Adventist eschatology
 History of the Seventh-day Adventist Church
 Teachings of Ellen G. White
 Inspiration of Ellen G. White
 Prophecy in the Seventh-day Adventist Church
 Investigative judgment
 The Pillars of Adventism
 Second Coming
 Conditional Immortality
 Historicism
 Three Angels' Messages
 Sabbath in seventh-day churches
 Ellen G. White
 Adventism
 Seventh-day Adventist Church Pioneers
 Seventh-day Adventist worship
 Ellen G. White Estate

References

Seventh-day Adventist religious workers
Ellen G. White Estate
Seventh-day Adventist administrators
American Seventh-day Adventist ministers
History of the Seventh-day Adventist Church
1930 births
2009 deaths